Robert Wayne Goodridge (born May 11, 1946) is a former American football wide receiver who played one season with the Minnesota Vikings of the National Football League (NFL). He was drafted by the Vikings in the sixth round of the 1968 NFL Draft. He played college football at Vanderbilt University.

Early years
Goodridge was a four-year letterman in  football, basketball and track at Wyoming High School in Wyoming, Ohio. He was a two-way starter his junior and senior years. He earned First-team All-Miami Valley Interscholastic League honors both seasons, was captain of the MVIL Offensive Team in 1963 and garnered WCPO First-team All-City defense recognition. Goodridge returned seven punts and one kickoff for touchdowns his last two seasons. He earned First-team All-City and Second-team All-Region honors in basketball. He also averaged 15.5 points per game his senior year. Goodridge was inducted into the Wyoming High School Hall of Fame in 1992.

College career
Goodridge joined the Vanderbilt Commodores in 1964 and saw playing time from 1966 to 1967. He became the first player in Southeastern Conference history to record more than 1,000 receiving yards and was named SEC Player of the Year. He also played in the Blue-Gray game and the Senior Bowl. Goodridge finished his college career with totals of 1,164 yards and six touchdowns on 82 receptions.

Professional career
Goodridge was selected by the Minnesota Vikings of the NFL with the 144th pick in the 1968 NFL Draft. He played in eleven games for the Vikings during the 1968 season.

Personal life
Goodridge has coached football for more than thirty years, including as head coach at various high schools in the Cincinnati area. He has also worked as a schoolteacher.

References

External links
 Just Sports Stats
 College stats

Living people
1946 births
21st-century American educators
American football wide receivers
Minnesota Vikings players
Vanderbilt Commodores football players
High school football coaches in Ohio
Players of American football from Cincinnati